BioTechniques: the International Journal of Life Science Methods is a peer-reviewed open-access scientific journal published by Future Science Group. It covers laboratory methods and techniques that are of broad interest to professional life scientists, as well as scientists from other disciplines (e.g. physics, chemistry, engineering, computer sciences) interested in life science applications of their technologies. The journal was established in 1983 by Eaton Associates, which was acquired in 2001 by Informa. The journal was then acquired by Future Science Group in 2018. It is distributed in both print and online form. 

The journal is supported by print and website advertising, and as of January 2019, began charging article processing fees.

Abstracting and indexing
The journal is abstracted and indexed in:

According to the Journal Citation Reports, the journal has a 2020 impact factor of 1.993.

References

External links

Biology journals
Future Science Group academic journals
Monthly journals
English-language journals
Publications established in 1983